Grbavica is an area of the city Novi Sad, Serbia.

Borders

The northern border of Grbavica is Futoška ulica (Futoška Street), the western borders are Ulica Vojvode Knićanina (Vojvoda Knićanin Street) and Ulica Kola srpskih sestara (Kolo srpskih sestara Street), the southern border is Bulevar Cara Lazara (Tzar Lazar Boulevard), and the eastern border is Bulevar Oslobođenja (Liberation Boulevard).

Name origin

Grbavica got its name from the Sarajevo settlement with the same name. When Grbavica in Novi Sad was built, the city used the same urbanistic plans, thus keeping the same name as well.

Neighbouring settlements
The neighbouring settlements are: Sajmište in the north, Stari Grad in the east, Liman in the south, and Adamovićevo Naselje in the west.

Features
The city's Catholic and Jewish graveyards are located in Grbavica.

See also
 Neighborhoods of Novi Sad

References

Jovan Mirosavljević, Brevijar ulica Novog Sada 1745–2001, Novi Sad, 2002.
Zoran Rapajić, Novi Sad bez tajni, Beograd, 2002.
30 godina mesne zajednice "7. Juli" u Novom Sadu 1974–2004, Novi Sad, 2004.

Gallery

External links

Stiže nova Grbavica, a odlazi stara (in Serbian)
Detailed map of Novi Sad and Grbavica
Map of Novi Sad

Novi Sad neighborhoods